The Portuguese Motorcycling Federation (FMP) (Portuguese: Federação de Motociclismo de Portugal; FMP) is the governing body of Motorcycling in Portugal.
It is based in the capital city of Lisbon.

It organises the Portuguese racing championships, which interests are: Enduro, Cross Country, Quad Cross, Motocross, Supercross, Offroad, SuperMoto, Stunt Riding, Trial and Road racing.

Besides racing, it covers several non-competitive activities like managing affiliated Clubs rallies calendar and events such as Portugal de Lés a Lés.

National members of the FIM
Motorcyclists organizations
Motorcycle racing
Motorcycling in Portugal